Lucien Linden (Lucien Charles Antoine Linden, 1851–1940) was a Belgian botanist. He was the son of Jean Jules Linden (1817–1898).

References

External links 
 
 

1851 births
1940 deaths
19th-century Belgian botanists
20th-century Belgian botanists